Helena Chidi Cawela Sousa (born 7 November 1994) is an Angolan handball player for Saint-Amand Handball and the Angolan national team.

In 2019, she represented Angola at the 2019 African Games and at the 2019 World Women's Handball Championship.

Achievements 
Carpathian Trophy:
Winner: 2019

References

External links
 

Angolan female handball players
1994 births
Living people
Handball players from Luanda
Handball players at the 2020 Summer Olympics